Lok Kawi is a township in the West Coast Division of Sabah, Malaysia. Located around the border of the districts of Penampang and Papar, and about 15 kilometres south of the state capital Kota Kinabalu, it has become part of the urban expanse of Kota Kinabalu. Nearby towns include Putatan in the north, and Kinarut in the south.

Originally a small village, Lok Kawi now features a small industrial estate as well a modern residential development. It is also the site for the Lok Kawi Army Camp (Kem Tentera Lok Kawi) and the Lok Kawi Wildlife Park. Lok Kawi also features one of the few Hindu temples in Kota Kinabalu, the Sri Subramaniyar Temple.

In the 1920s, the author W. Somerset Maugham was a frequent visitor to Lok Kawi: his niece was married to the manager of Lok Kawi Estate.

References 

Populated places in Sabah